Jonathan Freeman (born 27 April 1994) is a former professional Australian rules footballer who played for the Brisbane Lions in the Australian Football League (AFL).

Early life

Before his AFL career, Freeman was a part of Brisbane's Academy program, which would give Brisbane priority access to him when it came time for him to be drafted. Though he was eligible for the 2012 AFL draft and a physical fit to play as a key forward, he was overlooked by every club due to issues with his marking ability. Academy coach Ashley Drake attributed this to eye problems, similar to former Lions player Alastair Lynch, and Freeman consulted an eye doctor to help fix the issue. At the 2013 AFL draft,  attempted to draft him with pick 42, but as he was in Brisbane's Academy program they were able to draft him with pick 59 instead, becoming the first person from the program to make it to Brisbane's senior list.

AFL career

Freeman played most of the 2014 season in the NEAFL for Brisbane's reserves team as a key forward. He performed well enough to earn a debut in round 20 against , the team who had tried to draft him. In his second game he kicked a career-high 4 goals against  and showed efficiency with the ball, locking down his position for the rest of the season. For the next three years, Freeman had regular injury problems, keeping him out of the senior side most of the time. He played just six AFL matches in 2015 and four in 2016, then he wasn't able to play a single AFL match in 2017. He was delisted at the conclusion of the 2017 season.

Statistics

 Statistics are correct to the end of the 2017 season

|-
|- style="background-color: #EAEAEA"
! scope="row" style="text-align:center" | 2014
|style="text-align:center;"|
| 34 || 4 || 6 || 3 || 11 || 9 || 20 || 8 || 3 || 1.5 || 0.8 || 2.8 || 2.3 || 5.0 || 2.0 || 0.8
|-
! scope="row" style="text-align:center" | 2015
|style="text-align:center;"|
| 34 || 6 || 7 || 3 || 22 || 22 || 44 || 20 || 2 || 1.2 || 0.5 || 3.7 || 3.7 || 7.3 || 3.3 || 0.3
|- style="background-color: #EAEAEA"
! scope="row" style="text-align:center" | 2016
|style="text-align:center;"|
| 34 || 4 || 3 || 5 || 16 || 8 || 24 || 11 || 8 || 0.8 || 1.3 || 4.0 || 2.0 || 6.0 || 2.8 || 2.0
|-
! scope="row" style="text-align:center" | 2017
|style="text-align:center;"|
| 34 || 0 || — || — || — || — || — || — || — || — || — || — || — || — || — || —
|- class="sortbottom"
! colspan=3| Career
! 14
! 16
! 11
! 49
! 39
! 88
! 39
! 13
! 1.1
! 0.8
! 3.5
! 2.8
! 6.3
! 2.8
! 0.9
|}

References

External links

1994 births
Living people
Brisbane Lions players
Australian rules footballers from Queensland
Aspley Football Club players